Dream Merchant is a  R&B ballad written by Larry Weiss and Jerry Ross.  The song was originally recorded by Jerry Butler in 1967 as "Mr. Dream Merchant".  The Jerry Butler version reached #23 on the soul chart and #38 on the Hot 100.

Cover versions

In 1967 Madeline Bell covered "Mr. Dream Merchant" on her first album, Bell's a Poppin'''.
Dusty Springfield included a version of the song on her 1968 album Dusty... Definitely''.
In 1975 the song was remade by Louisville, Kentucky-based group New Birth.  Their version was the group's only #1 hit on the soul chart and one of three songs to make the top 10 on that chart; it was one of two New Birth entries to hit the Top 40, reaching #36 on the pop chart.

References

1967 songs
1967 singles
1975 singles
New Birth (band) songs
Songs written by Jerry Ross (composer)
Songs written by Larry Weiss